God of Gamblers III: Back to Shanghai (lit. Knight of Gamblers II: Shanghai Beach's Saint of Gamblers) is a 1991 Hong Kong comedy film, a sequel to God of Gamblers II (1990). The film is directed by Wong Jing, and stars Stephen Chow and Ng Man-tat. God of Gamblers III continues the story of the Saint of Gamblers (Chow), and does not feature the Knight of Gamblers or the God of Gamblers. The story is about Chow accidentally going back in time to Shanghai in 1937, as he tries to figure out how to return to Hong Kong in 1991.

Plot
After the events in God of Gamblers II, Tai-kun, who lost his ESP powers, has regained the abilities again and seeks revenge against Sing, the Saint of Gamblers. When Tai-kun, aided by his fellow disciples, exerts ESP powers under full force against Sing who is doing likewise to them, the spacetime becomes distorted and sends Tai-kun and Sing to Shanghai in 1937.

Meeting his own grandfather Chow Tai-fook and the benign millionaire Ding Lik, Sing must deal with Ding Lik's foes and the Japanese military forces, with his "mistaken" crush on one of a pair of twin sisters, find out who defeated the French "God of Gamblers", Pierre Cashon, in that era (the mysterious "Comment allez-vous"), and finally find out how to travel back to Hong Kong in 1991 and meet the resurfaced Lady Dream. The movie culminates in a poker battle with Sing and the French God of Gamblers, with the fate of Shanghai in the balance.

Cast
 Stephen Chow as Chow Sing-cho, the "Saint of Gamblers"
 Ng Man-tat as Uncle Tat / Chow Tai-fook
 Gong Li as Miss Yu-san / Yu-mong (Yu-san means "fairy-like" while Yu-mong means "dream-like")
 Sandra Ng as Spring
 Ray Lui as Ding Lik (Lui reprised his role from 1980's TV series of TVB - Shanghai Tan).
 Charles Heung as Lung Ng
 Lung Fong as Wong Kam-kwai
 Sharla Cheung as Yee-mong, Lady Dream (cameo)
 Barry Wong as Commissioner Wong (cameo)
 John Ching as Tai-kun, Devil of Gamblers
 Wong Wan-sze as Yoshiko Kawashima
 Declan Michael Wong as Pierre Cashon
 Wong Jing as H.K cop

Parodies and references
The movie makes use of its cast to make references to other well known Hong Kong media. Barry Wong plays a supporting role as a Police Chief in 1991 Hong Kong, a role he also played in the Chow Yun-fat film, The Killer. Ray Lui plays Ding Lik, a role he also played in the Hong Kong dramatic TV series, The Bund. Lung Fong has a supporting role as a Chinese backer of the Japanese in 1937 Shanghai. His character accidentally kills the main character's love interest by defenestration, an action also performed by his character in the original God of Gamblers, which Stephen Chow's God of Gamblers films were spun off from. Billy Chow plays an unnamed Japanese soldier who is identical in costume and appearance to the character of General Fujita which he played in the Jet Li film Fist of Legend.

Title
The two titles, Chinese and English, has discrepancies with each other. The English title, however being God of Gamblers III: Back to Shanghai, does not feature the God of Gamblers, played by Chow Yun-fat. The Chinese title is translated to Knight of Gamblers II: Shanghai Beach's Saint of Gamblers, but the Knight, played by Andy Lau, is also entirely absent in this film. To clarify that, Shanghai Beach does not literally refers to the shores of Shanghai. It refers to a TVB drama called The Bund in the 1980s, which featured the clash between Shanghainese triads set in the era of the 1930s.

See also
God of Gamblers (1989)
All for the Winner (1990)
God of Gamblers II (1991)
God of Gamblers Returns (1994)

Notes

References

External links

1991 films
1990s Cantonese-language films
Hong Kong slapstick comedy films
1990s fantasy comedy films
Films about gambling
Hong Kong sequel films
Films directed by Wong Jing
Films set in Hong Kong
Films set in Shanghai
Films about time travel
1991 comedy films
1990s Hong Kong films